The San Marcos Mill Tract is a historical tract of land located in San Marcos, Texas. It is recognized as a historic place by the Texas Historical Commission.

History 
The tract is located on land that was granted to Juan M. de Veramendi in 1831.

The property was later purchased in 1844 by Edward Burleson, where he built the first dam on the San Marcos River, simultaneously providing power for a grist mill and sawmill. The tract was later used as a cotton gin, three different icehouses, a waterworks, and an electric power plant. The tract evolved into an industrial park, substantially impacting the local economy.

In more recent years, the tract has served as various scenic restaurants, such as Peppers at the Falls, Joe's Crab Shack, Saltgrass Steak House, and others.

Footnotes

External links 
San Marcos Mill Tract TX10323 - HistoricMarkers.com
Saltgrass Steak House Restaurant of Texas

San Marcos, Texas
Geography of Hays County, Texas